Mouloukou Souleyman Diabate (born 21 July 1987), commonly known as Solo Diabate, is an Ivorian basketball player who plays for Petro de Luanda of the Angolan Basketball League and the Basketball Africa League (BAL). 

He also represents the Ivory Coast national team. With Ivory Coast, Diabate has won two silver medals at AfroBasket tournaments in 2009 and 2021.

Professional career
Diabate has played in the French League since 2006. In his career, he played for JDA Dijon Basket, Chorale Roanne Basket, SLUC Nancy Basket, and BCM Gravelines. In 2015, he signed with Rouen Métropole. In the 2015-2016 season, Diabate was the league's assist leader with 6.5 per game to go with his 10.4 points and 3.5 rebounds per game. On February 16, 2017, Diabate signed with the French team Châlons-Reims, after starting the season with MZT Skopje.

On 4 November 2016, he signed with MZT Skopje Aerodrom. On 13 January 2017, he left MZT Skopje On September 11, 2018, he signed with SLUC Nancy.
In 2021, Diabate signed with Zamalek to play in the 2021 BAL season, where they won the first-ever championship of the new league.

In August 2021, Diabate signed with Smouha SC to stay in Egypt. On 28 September 2021, Diabate was loaned to Al Ittihad to play in the 2021 Arab Club Basketball Championship. He replaced the injured Corey Webster.

On 10 February 2022, Diabate signed with US Monastir ahead of the 2022 BAL season. He helped Monastir win the championships by winning the 2022 BAL Finals; Diabate became the first player ever to win two BAL championships.

In September 2022, Diabate signed a contract for Petro de Luanda in Angola.

International career 
Diabate was a member of the Ivory Coast national basketball team at the 2007 and 2009 FIBA Africa Championship.  In 2009, he helped the team to a surprise silver medal to qualify for the country's first FIBA World Championship in 24 years. On 19 June 2015, Diabate was one of 27 players to be named to the Ivory Coast's preliminary squad for the 2015 Africa Championship by head coach Hugues Occansey.

Diabate played with Ivory Coast at AfroBasket 2021 in Rwanda and got his second silver medal.

BAL career statistics

|-
|style="text-align:left;background:#afe6ba;"|2021†
|style="text-align:left;"|Zamalek
| 5 || 0 || 18.1 || .439 || style="background:#cfecec;"| .591* || .750 || 1.6 || 4.6 || 1.6 || .0 || 10.4
|-
|style="text-align:left;background:#afe6ba;"|2022†
|style="text-align:left;"|Monastir
| 6 || 3 || 25.3 || .339 || .190 || .889 || 3.2 || 4.0 || 1.3 || .0 || 8.3

References

1987 births
Living people
ABA League players
Anhui Dragons players
BCM Gravelines players
Champagne Châlons-Reims Basket players
Chorale Roanne Basket players
Fujian Sturgeons players
Ivorian expatriate basketball people in France
Ivorian men's basketball players
JDA Dijon Basket players
KK MZT Skopje players
US Monastir basketball players
Point guards
SLUC Nancy Basket players
Sportspeople from Abidjan
Zamalek SC basketball players
2010 FIBA World Championship players
2019 FIBA Basketball World Cup players
Fos Provence Basket players
Al Ittihad Alexandria Club basketball players